Charles James Watkins (12 July 1846 – 27 May 1906) was an English entomologist known for his studies on the natural history of Gloucestershire.  He was elected a Fellow of the Entomological Society of London in 1900. His extensive collection of insects, noted for its completeness and rare specimens, was acquired by the Bristol Museum & Art Gallery after his death.

References

1846 births
1906 deaths
English lepidopterists
People from Gloucestershire